The IBM Thinkpad 350 series was a notebook computer series introduced in 1993 by IBM as part of their Thinkpad laptop series. It was the successor to the IBM ThinkPad 300. With only 2 models ever made in the series, it was succeeded in 1994 by the IBM Thinkpad 360 series.

History 
The 350 was announced in June 1993. The 125MB disk version started shipping in June 1993, the 250MB version started shipping in July.

Features 
The 350 series shipped with IBM PC DOS 5.02 as the included operating system. 

Both models in the series came with an Intel 486SL running at 25 MHz, and a CT-65530 video controller with 1 MB of video memory. Both models also had a standard 4 MB of RAM that was on a proprietary IC DRAM Card. If a user wanted to upgrade the ram, the 350 ThinkPads supported an IC DRAM Card size up to 20 MB.

Both in the series came with a 125 or 250 MB standard hard drive, and a non-removable 1.44 MB floppy drive. Both models also had a battery life up to 9 hours.

In March 1994, IBM cut the prices by 12%.

The 350 is identical to the PS/Note 425 and the 350C is identical to the PS/Note 400SL/25.

Models 
IBM ThinkPad 350 — The first model in the series, it introduced a Intel 486SL running at 25 MHz, a monochrome 9.5" STN display with 640x480 resolution, 4 MB of ram on an IC DRAM Card, a non-removable 3.5" 1.44 MB floppy drive and a 250 MB hard disk drive. The 350 weighed 5.2lb in total, and started at $2,099. Other features included: Trackpoint II, Type II PCMIA slot.

IBM ThinkPad 350C — Basically the same as the first, and also the second and last in the series, it only had 1 notable change to a 9.2" STL LCD 640x480 256 color display. It also added the additional option of a 125 MB hard drive alongside the 250 MB option. It weighed 5.7lbs, a .5lb gain from the base 350 model. The 350C started at a price of $1,999 with the highest being $2,399.

Comparison

Reception 
A review by the Los Angeles Times considered the ThinkPad 350 not an impressive machine due the fact it was bundling IBM DOS instead of MS-DOS or Microsoft Windows. A review of the 350C by InfoWorld noted the good screen and the relatively short battery life.

References 

ThinkPad 350
350